

F

F (2010)
F2: Fun and Frustration (2019)
F3 (2022)
F for Fake (1974)
The F Word: (2005 & 2013)
F.I.S.T. (1978)
F/X (1986)
F/X2 (1991)
The F**k-It List (2020)

Fa

Faa-Fam

Faande Poriya Boga Kaande Re (2011)
Faat Kiné (2000)
The Fab Five (2011 TV)
Fab Five: The Texas Cheerleader Scandal (2008 TV)
The Fabelmans (2022)
Fabian (1980)
Fabian: Going to the Dogs (2021)
Fabiola: (1918 & 1949)
The Fable of Elvira and Farina and the Meal Ticket (1915)
The Fable of the Kid Who Shifted His Ideals to Golf and Finally Became a Baseball Fan and Took the Only Known Cure (1916)
The Fable of the Roistering Blades (1915)
The Fable of the Small Town Favorite Who Was Ruined by Too Much Competition (1916)
Fabulous (2019)
The Fabulous Allan Carr (2017)
The Fabulous Baker Boys (1989)
The Fabulous Baron Munchausen (1962)
The Fabulous Bastard from Chicago (1969)
Fabulous Boys (2013)
The Fabulous Doctor Fable (1973)
The Fabulous Dorseys (1947)
The Fabulous Joe (1947)
The Fabulous Senorita (1952)
The Fabulous Suzanne (1946)
The Fabulous Texan (1947)
The Fabulous Udin (2016)
The Fabulous Voyage of the Angel (1991)
Face: (1997, 2000, 2004 & 2009)
The Face of Another (1966)
A Face in the Crowd (1957)
A Face to Die For (1996 TV)
Face to Face: (1952, 1963, 1967, 1976, 1979, 1984 & 2011)
Face 2 Face: (2012 American & 2012 Malayalam)
The Face of Fu Manchu (1965)
Face of the Screaming Werewolf (1964)
Face/Off (1997)
Faceless: (1988 & 2016)
Faces: (1934 & 1968)
Faces of Death (1978)
Faces Places (2017)
Facing the Giants (2006)
Facing the Wall (2016)
Facing Windows (2003)
Factory Boss (2014)
Factory Girl (2006)
Factotum (2006)
The Faculty (1998)
Fade to Black: (1980 & 2004)
Fading of the Cries (2011)
Fading Gigolo (2013)
Fading Wave (2015)
Faeries: (1981 & 1999)
Fahrenheit 451: (1966 & 2018)
Fahrenheit 9/11 (2004)
Fahrenheit 11/9 (2018)
FahrenHYPE 9/11 (2004)
Fail-Safe: (1964 & 2000 TV)
Failan (2001)
Failure to Launch (2006)
The Fair (1960)
Fair Game: (1986, 1995, 2005 & 2010)
The Fairly OddParents series:
A Fairly Odd Movie: Grow Up, Timmy Turner! (2011 TV)
A Fairly Odd Christmas (2012 TV)
A Fairly Odd Summer (2014 TV)
Fairy (2020)
The Fairy (2011)
Fairy Tail series:
Fairy Tail the Movie: Phoenix Priestess (2012)
Fairy Tail: Dragon Cry (2017)
The Fairylogue and Radio-Plays (1908)
FairyTale: A True Story (1997)
Faithful: (1910, 1936 & 1996)
The Faithful Heart: (1922 & 1932)
The Faithful Son (2017)
Faithless: (1932 & 2000)
Fake (2003)
The Fake: (1927, 1953 & 2013)
Falcon Down (2000)
Falcon Rising (2014)
The Falcon and the Snowman (1985)
The Falcon Takes Over (1942)
Falcons (2002)
Falkenberg Farewell (2006)
The Fall: (2006 & 2008)
The Fall of Ako Castle (1978)
The Fall of the Essex Boys (2013)
A Fall from Grace (2020)
Fall Guy: (1947 & 1982)
The Fall Guy: (1921 & 1930)
The Fall of the House of Usher: (1928 American, 1928 French & 1950)
Fall in Love Like a Star (2015)
Fall of the Mohicans (1965)
The Fall of the Roman Empire (1964)
Fallen: (1998 & 2016)
Fallen Angel (1945)
Fallen Angels (1995)
The Fallen Idol (1948)
Falling: (2015, 2017 & 2020)
The Falling: (1986 & 2014)
Falling for Christmas (2022)
Falling Down (1993)
Falling Flowers (2012)
Falling Hare (1943)
Falling Leaves: (1912 & 1966)
Falling in Love: (1935 & 1984)
The Fallout (2021)
The Falls: (1980 & 2021)
False Hare (1964)
False Positive (2021)
Falstaff (1965)
Fame: (1936, 1980 & 2009)
La Famille Bélier (2014)
Family Business: (1986 & 1989)
Family Camp (2022)
The Family Game (1983)
The Family Jewels (1965)
The Family Man (2000)
Family Plan: (1997 & 2005 TV)
Family Plot (1976)
Family Romance, LLC (2019)
The Family Secret: (1924, 1936 & 1951)
The Family Stone (2005)
The Family That Preys (2008)
The Family Way (1966)
Familyhood (2016)
"#FamilyMan" (2022)

Fan-Fay

The Fan: (1949, 1951, 1958, 1981 & 1996)
Fan Chan (2003)
Fanaa: (2006 & 2010)
Fanatic: (1965 & 1982)
The Fanatic (2019)
Fanatics: (1917 & 2012)
Fanboys (2009)
Fancy Pants (1950)
Fandango: (1949 & 1985)
Fando and Lis (1972)
The Fandom (2020)
Fanfan la Tulipe: (1925, 1952 & 2003)
Fanny: (1932, 1933, 1961 & 2013)
Fanny and Alexander (1982)
Fanny by Gaslight (1944)
Fanny Lye Deliver'd (2019)
Fanny: The Right to Rock (2021)
Fantasia: (1940, 2004 & 2014)
Fantasia 2000 (1999)
The Fantasist (1986)
Fantastic Beasts and Where to Find Them series:
Fantastic Beasts and Where to Find Them (2016)
Fantastic Beasts: The Crimes of Grindelwald (2018)
Fantastic Beasts: The Secrets of Dumbledore (2022)
Fantastic Four:
Fantastic Four: (1994, 2005 & 2015)
Fantastic Four: Rise of the Silver Surfer (2007)                                                                                                
Fantastic Mr. Fox (2009)
Fantastic Planet (1973)
A Fantastic Woman (2017)
The Fantasticks (1995)
Fantasy Island (2020)
Fantômas: (1913, 1920, 1932, 1946 & 1964)
FAQ: Frequently Asked Questions (2004)
Far and Away (1992)
Far Cry (2008)
Far from Heaven (2002)
Far from the Madding Crowd: (1915, 1967, 1998 & 2015)
Faraway, So Close! (1993)
Farce of the Penguins (2007)
Farewell: (1930, 1983 & 2009)
The Farewell: (2000 & 2019)
A Farewell to Arms: (1932 & 1957)
A Farewell to Jinu (2015)
Farewell to the King (1989)
Farewell My Concubine (1993)
Farewell, My Lovely: (1944 & 1975)
Farewell, My Queen (2012)
Farewell Performance (1963)
Farewell to St. Petersburg (1972)
Farewells (1958)
Fargo (1996)
Farinelli (1994)
Farm House II (2014)
The Farmer (1977)
The Farmer Takes a Wife: (1935 & 1953)
The Farmer's Daughter: (1928, 1940, 1947 & 1962 TV)
Farmer's Daughters (1976)
The Farmer's Wife: (1928 & 1941)
Farsighted for Two Diopters (1976)
Farz: (1967 & 2001)
Fascination: (1922 & 1979)
"#Fashionvictim" (2018)
 Fast Charlie... the Moonbeam Rider (1979)
Fast Company: (1918, 1924, 1929, 1938, 1953 & 1979)
Fast Food Nation (2006)
The Fast and the Furious (1954)
The Fast and the Furious series:
The Fast and the Furious (2001)
2 Fast 2 Furious (2003)
The Fast and the Furious: Tokyo Drift (2006)
Fast & Furious (2009)
Fast Five (2011)
Fast & Furious 6 (2013)
Furious 7 (2015)
The Fate of the Furious (2017)
F9 (2021)
Fast X (2023)
Fast and Furry-ous (1949)
Fast Getaway (1991)
Fast Getaway II (1994)
Fast Times at Ridgemont High (1982)
Fast, Cheap & Out of Control (1997)
Fasten Your Seatbelt (2013)
Fasten Your Seatbelts (2014)
Faster: (2003 & 2010)
Faster, Pussycat! Kill! Kill! (1965)
The Fastest Guitar Alive (1967)
Fat Albert (2004)
Fat Choi Spirit (2002)
Fat City (1972)
Fat Girl (2001)
Fat Man and Little Boy (1989)
Fat Pizza (2003)
Fat, Sick & Nearly Dead (2010)
Fata Morgana: (1965, 1971 & 2007)
Fatal Attraction (1987)
Fatal Beauty (1987)
Fatal Fury 2: The New Battle (1993)
Fatal Fury: Legend of the Hungry Wolf (1994)
Fatal Fury: The Motion Picture (1994)
Fatal Instinct (1993)
Fatal Intuition (2015)
Fatale (2020)
Fate: (1913, 2001 & 2008)
Fate series:
Fate/stay night: Unlimited Blade Works (2010)
Fate/Grand Order: First Order (2016 TV)
Fate/kaleid liner Prisma Illya: Oath Under Snow (2017)
Fate/stay night: Heaven's Feel (2017)
Fate/stay night: Heaven's Feel II. lost butterfly (2019)
Fate/stay night: Heaven's Feel III. spring song (2020)
The Fate of Lee Khan (1973)
Fateless (2005)
Father: (1966, 1990, 2000, 2007 & 2011)
The Father: (1979, 1996, 2019 & 2020)
Father of the Bride: (1950, 1991 & 2022)
Father of the Bride Part II (1995)
Father Brown (1954)
Father Christmas (1991)
Father Christmas Is Back (2021)
Father Figures (2017)
Father Goose (1964)
Father of My Children (2009)
Father Sergius (1917)
Father Stu (2022)
Father of the Year (2018)
Father's Day: (1930, 1996, 1997, 2011 & 2012)
Father's Little Dividend (1951)
Fatherland: (1986 & 1994 TV)
Fathom: (1967 & 2021)
Fatima: (1938, 2015 & 2020)
Fatman (2020)
Fatty Finn (1980)
Fatty and Mabel Adrift (1916)
Fatty's Tintype Tangle (1915)
Fatwa: (2006 & 2018)
Fauci (2021)
Faust: (1926, 1960, 1994 & 2011)
Faust: Love of the Damned (2001)
Fausto (2018)
Le fauteuil (2009)
The Favor: (1994 & 2006)
La Favorite (2023)
The Favorite: (1935, 1976 & 1989)
Favorites of the Moon (1984)
The Favourite (2018)
Fay Grim (2006)
Faya Dayi (2021)

Fb–Ff

"#FBF" (2022)
The FBI Story (1959)
Fear: (1917, 1946, 1954, 1990, 1996, 2020 & 2023)
The Fear: (1966, 1995 & 2015)
Fear of a Black Hat (1994)
Fear and Desire (1953)
Fear Is the Key (1972)
Fear and Loathing in Las Vegas (1998)
Fear Me Not (2008)
Fear in the Night: (1947 & 1972)
Fear No Evil: (1945, 1969 TV & 1981)
Fear Over the City (1975)
Fear of Rain (2021)
Fear Street series:
Fear Street Part One: 1994 (2021)
Fear Street Part Two: 1978 (2021)
Fear Street Part Three: 1666 (2021)
Fear and Trembling (2003)
Fear X (2003)
FeardotCom (2002)
Fearless: (1993 & 2006)
The Fearless Hyena (1979)
The Fearless Vampire Killers (1967)
Feast: (2014 & 2021)
Feast series:
Feast (2005)
Feast 2: Sloppy Seconds (2008)
Feast III: The Happy Finish (2009)
The Feast (2021)
Feast of July (1995)
Feast of Love (2007)
Feast of the Seven Fishes (2018)
Fedora: (1913, 1918, 1926, 1942 & 1978)
Feds (1988)
Feed: (2005 & 2017)
Feed Me (2013)
Feeling Minnesota (1996)
Feet of Clay: (1960 & 2007)
Feet First (1930)
Felicia's Journey (1999)
Felicity (1978)
Felicity: An American Girl Adventure (2005 TV)
Fellers (1930)
Fellini Satyricon (1969)
Fellini's Casanova (1977)
The Female Brain (2017)
Female Convict Scorpion: Jailhouse 41 (1972)
The Female Highwayman (1906)
Female Trouble (1974)
Female Vampire (1973)
Femme Fatale: (1991 & 2002)
La Femme Nikita (1990)
Feminism WTF (2023)
The Fencer (2015)
Fences (2016)
Fengming, a Chinese Memoir (2007)
Ferdinand (2017)
FernGully: The Last Rainforest (1992)
FernGully 2: The Magical Rescue (1998)
Ferris Bueller's Day Off (1986)
Ferry Tales (2003)
Festen (1998)
Festival: (1967, 1996, 2001 & 2005)
Festival in Cannes (2001)
Festival Express (2003)
Fetih 1453 (2012)
Fetters (1961)
Feu Mathias Pascal (1925)
The Feud: (1910 & 1919)
A Feud in the Kentucky Hills (1912)
Feud of the Range (1939)
Feud of the West (1936)
Fever Lake (1996)
Fever Pitch: (1985, 1997 & 2005)
A Few Good Men (1992)
Ffolkes (1979)

Fi

Fia-Fif

Fiat Lux (1923)
Ficció (2006)
Fickle Fatty's Fall (1915)
Fiction and Other Truths: A Film About Jane Rule (1995)
Fidaa: (2017 & 2018)
Fiddle (2010)
Fiddler on the Roof (1971)
Fiddler: A Miracle of Miracles (2019)
Fiddlers Three: (1944 & 1948)
Fiddlesticks: (1927 & 1930)
Fidel: (2002 & 2009)
Fidel: The Untold Story (2001)
Fidelio: Alice's Odyssey (2014)
Fidelity: (2000 & 2019)
Fido (2006)
Fiebre (1971)
Fiebre de amor (1985)
Fiebre de juventud (1966)
Fiebre de primavera (1965)
Field of Dreams (1989)
A Field in England (2013)
Field of Honor: (1986 & 1987)
Field of Lost Shoes (2014)
Fields of Sacrifice (1964)
Fiend (1980)
Fiend of Dope Island (1961)
Fiend Without a Face (1958)
The Fiendish Plot of Dr. Fu Manchu (1980)
Fierce Creatures (1997)
Fierce People (2005)
Fierro (2007)
Fierrot le pou (1990)
Fiery Fireman (1928)
Fiery Summer (1939)
Fiesta: (1941 & 1947)
Fiesta Fiasco (1967)
Fiete im Netz (1958)
Fietje Peters, Poste Restante (1935)
Fietsen naar de Maan (1963)
Fiffty Fiffty (1981)
Fifi Blows Her Top (1958)
Fifteen and Pregnant (1998 TV)
Fifteen Wives (1934)
Fifth Avenue (1926)
Fifth Avenue Girl (1939)
Fifth Avenue Models (1925)
The Fifth Cord (1971)
The Fifth Element (1997)
The Fifth Estate (2013)
The Fifth Horseman Is Fear (1965)
The Fifth Missile (1986 TV)
The Fifth of November (2018)
The Fifth Wave (2016)
Fifth Ward (1997)
Fifty (2015)
Fifty Dead Men Walking (2008)
Fifty Million Frenchmen (1931)
Fifty Pills (2006)
Fifty Roads to Town (1937)
Fifty Shades series:
Fifty Shades of Grey (2015)
Fifty Shades Darker (2017)
Fifty Shades Freed (2018)
Fifty Shades of Black (2016)

Fig-Fil

Fig Leaves (1926)
Fig Tree (2018)
Fig Trees (2009)
Figaro (1929)
Figaro Here, Figaro There (1950)
Figaro and His Great Day (1931)
Figght (2019)
Fight Back to School series:
Fight Back to School (1991)
Fight Back to School II (1992)
Fight Back to School III (1993)
Fight Batman Fight! (1973)
Fight Club (1999)
Fight Club – Members Only (2006)
Fight for the Dardanelles (1915)
Fight or Flight (2007)
Fight Girl (2018)
Fight It Out (1920)
Fight Lah! Kopitiam  (2020)
Fight Life (2012)
Fight for Life (1987)
A Fight for Love (1919)
Fight for Nanjing, Shanghai and Hangzhou (1999)
Fight Night (2009)
Fight for the Planet (2009)
Fight of the Tertia: (1929 & 1952)
Fight for Us (1989)
Fight Valley (2016)
Fight to Win (1987)
Fight for Your Life (1977)
Fight for Your Lady (1937)
Fight, Zatoichi, Fight (1964)
Fighter in the Wind (2004)
The Fighter: (1921, 1952 & 2010)
Fighter: (2000, 2007 & 2012)
Fighter's Paradise (1924)
The Fighters (1974)
Fighters (2014)
Fighting: (2009 & 2014)
The Fighting 69th (1940)
Fighting Elegy (1966)
The Fighting Kentuckian (1949)
Fighting with My Family (2019)
The Fighting Seabees (1944)
The Fighting Sullivans (1944)
The Fighting Temptations (2003)
Figures in a Landscape (1970)
Fiji Love (2014)
Filantropica (2002)
The File of the Golden Goose (1969)
Filibus (1915)
Film (1965)
Film Geek (2005)
Film Portrait (1970)
Film Stars Don't Die in Liverpool (2017)
A Film Unfinished (2010)
Filmworker (2017)
The Filth and the Fury (2000)

Fin-Fiz

Final (2001)
The Final (2010)
Final Account (2020)
Final Analysis (1992)
The Final Countdown (1980)
Final Cut: (1980, 1998 & 2004)
Final Destination series:
Final Destination (2000)
Final Destination 2 (2003)
Final Destination 3 (2006)
The Final Destination (2009)
Final Destination 5 (2011)
Final Fantasy series:
Final Fantasy: Legend of the Crystals (1994)
Final Fantasy: The Spirits Within (2001)
Final Fantasy VII Advent Children (2005)
Last Order: Final Fantasy VII (2005)
Kingsglaive: Final Fantasy XV (2015)
Final Justice: (1985, 1988, & 1997)
 Final Move (2015)
Final Score: (2007 & 2017)
Final Set (2020)
Final Straw: Food, Earth, Happiness (2015)
The Final Terror (1983)
Finale (2009)
Finch (2021)
Find Me Guilty (2006)
Finder's Fee (2001)
Finding Forrester (2000)
Finding Nemo series:
Finding Nemo (2003)
Finding Dory (2016)
Finding Neverland (2004)
Finding 'Ohana (2021)
Finding Vivian Maier (2013)
Finding You (2021)
The Fine Art of Love: Mine Ha-Ha (2005)
A Fine Madness (1966)
The Finest Hours: (1964 & 2016)
Fingers: (1941 & 1978)
Finian's Rainbow (1968)
The Finishers (2013)
The Finishing Touch (1928)
F. I. R. (1999)
The Fire: (1916 & 2015)
Fire: (1996, 2002 & 2020)
Fire!: (1901, 1977 TV & 1991)
Fire Down Below: (1957 & 1997)
Fire Festival (1985)
Fire Fighters (1922)
Fire with Fire: (1986 & 2012)
Fire and Ice: (1983 & 1986)
Fire and Ice: The Dragon Chronicles (2008 TV)
Fire and Ice: The Winter War of Finland and Russia (2005)
Fire Island (2022)
Fire of Love: (1925, 1967 & 2022)
Fire Maidens from Outer Space (1956)
Fire on the Mountain: (1981 & 1996)
Fire Over England (1937)
Fire Sale (1977)
Fire in the Sky (1993)
The Fire Within (1963)
Firebreather (2010 TV)
Firecreek (1968)
Fired Up! (2009)
Fireflies in the Garden (2008)
Firefox (1982)
Firehouse: (1987 & 1997)
Firehouse Dog (2007)
Firelight: (1964 & 1998)
The Fireman: (1916 & 1931)
Fireman (2015)
The Firemen's Ball (1967)
Fireproof (2008)
Fires on the Plain: (1959 & 2014)
Fires Were Started (1943)
Firestarter: (1984 & 2022)
Firestorm: (1998 & 2013)
Firewalker (1986)
Firewall (2006)
Firewater (1994)
Fire!: (1901, 1977 & 1991)
The Firm: (1989 TV, 1993 & 2009)
The First $20 Million Is Always the Hardest (2002)
First Ball (1941)
The First Beautiful Thing (2010)
First Blood (1982)
The First Born: (1921 & 1928)
First Born (2007)
First Cow (2019)
First Daughter: (1999 TV & 2004)
First Descent (2005)
The First Film (2015)
The First Great Train Robbery (1978)
First Knight (1995)
First Love, Last Rites (1997)
First Man (2018)
First Man into Space (1959)
First of May: (1958 & 2015)
The First of May (1998)
The First Men in the Moon: (1919 & 1964)
The First Monday in May (2016)
First Monday in October (1981)
First on the Moon (2005)
First Name: Carmen (1983)
The First Purge (2018)
First Reformed (2017)
First Spaceship on Venus (1962)
First Sunday (2008)
First They Killed My Father (2017)
The First Time: (1952, 1969, 2009 & 2012)
First Time (2012)
The First Wave (2021)
The First Wives Club (1996)
Firstborn (1984)
A Fish in the Bathtub (1999)
Fish and Elephant (2001)
A Fish Called Wanda (1988)
Fish Tank (2009)
The Fisher King (1991)
Fishing Without Nets: (2012 & 2014)
Fist Fight (2017)
Fist of Fury (1972)
Fist of Legend (1994)
Fist of the North Star: (1986 & 1995)
A Fistful of Dollars (1964)
A Fistful of Dynamite (1971)
A Fistful of Fingers (1995)
Fists in the Pocket (1965)
Fists of Fury (1971)
Fit (2010)
Fit Lover (2008)
Fitoor (2016)
The Fits (2015)
Fitzcarraldo (1982)
Fitzwilly (1967)
Five Came Back (1939)
Five Corners (1987)
The Five Days (1973)
Five Days, Five Nights: (1960 & 1996)
Five Deadly Venoms (1978)
Five Easy Pieces (1970)
Five Elements Ninjas (1982)
Five Feet Apart (2019)
Five Fingers: (2005 & 2006)
Five Girls (2006)
Five Graves to Cairo (1943)
The Five Heartbeats (1991)
Five for Hell (1969)
Five Hundred Miles (2023)
Five Killers (2009)
Five Miles to Midnight (1962)
Five Minutes of Heaven (2009)
Five Minutes to Tomorrow (2014)
The Five Obstructions (2003)
The Five Pennies (1959)
Five Star Final (1931)
The Five Year Engagement (2012)
The Fix (1997)
Fiza (2000)

Fj–Fm

 Fjols til fjells (1957)
 Flag Day (2021)
The Flag: A Story Inspired by the Tradition of Betsy Ross (1927)
Flags of Our Fathers (2006)
Flagpole Jitters (1956)
Flakes (2007)
The Flame and the Arrow (1950)
Flame & Citron (2008)
Flaming Star (1960)
The Flamingo Kid (1984)
Flamingo Road (1949)
Flap (1970)
Flarsky (2019)
The Flash (2023)
Flash of Genius (2008)
Flash Gordon: (1936 & 1980)
Flash Gordon Conquers the Universe (1940)
Flash Gordon's Trip to Mars (1938)
Flashback: (1969 & 1990)
Flashbacks of a Fool (2008)
Flashdance (1983)
The Flat: (1921, 1968 & 2011)
Flatland (2007)
Flatland: The Movie (2007)
Flatland 2: Sphereland (2012)
Flatliners: (1990 & 2017)
Flat! (2010)
The Flavor of Corn (1986)
The Flavor of Green Tea over Rice (1952)
The Flaw: (1933 & 1955)
Flawless: (1999 & 2008)
The Flea Circus (1954)
Fled (1996)
Die Fledermaus (1923)
Flee (2021)
Fleet of Time (2014)
Fleisch (1979)
The Flesh (1991)
Flesh: (1932 & 1968)
Flesh for the Beast (2003)
Flesh and Blood: (1922, 1951, 1968 TV, 1985 & 2017)
Flesh and Bone (1993)
Flesh and the Devil (1927)
Flesh and Fantasy (1943)
The Flesh and the Fiends (1960)
Flesh for Frankenstein (1973)
Flesh and Fury (1952)
Flesh Gordon (1974)
Flesh Gordon Meets the Cosmic Cheerleaders (1989)
Flesheater (1988)
Fletch (1985)
Fletch Lives (1989)
Flicka (2006)
Flickering Lights (2000)
Flight: (1929, 2009, 2012 & 2021)
Flight 93 (2006) (TV)
Flight from Folly (1945)
The Flight of Dragons (1982)
Flight of the Intruder (1991)
Flight of the Living Dead (2008)
Flight to Mars (1951)
Flight of the Navigator (1986)
The Flight of the Phoenix: (1965 & 2004)
Flight of the Raven (1984)
Flight of the Red Balloon (2007)
Flight of the Red Tail (2009)
Flight of the White Wolf (1990)
Flightplan (2005)
The Flim-Flam Man (1967)
Flinch (2021)
The Flintstones series:
The Flintstones (1994)
A Flintstones Christmas Carol (1994)
The Flintstones in Viva Rock Vegas (2000)
The Flintstones: On the Rocks (2001)
The Flintstones & WWE: Stone Age SmackDown! (2015)
Flipped: (2010 & 2015)
Flipper: (1963 & 1996)
Flipper's New Adventure (1964)
Flipping Out (2007)
Flirt: (1983 & 1995)
The Flirt: (1917 & 1922)
Flirtation: (1927 & 1934)
Flirtation Walk (1934)
Flirting (1991)
Flirting with Disaster (1996)
The Flirting Husband (1912)
Flirting Scholar (1993)
Floating Clouds (1955)
The Floating Dutchman (1952)
Floating Life (1996)
Floating Weeds (1959)
The Flock (2007)
The Floorwalker (1916)
Flora (2017)
Flora & Ulysses (2021)
Florence Foster Jenkins (2016)
The Florentine (1999)
A Florida Enchantment (1914)
A Florida Feud (1909)
The Florida Project (2017)
Flower Drum Song (1961)
The Flower of Evil (2003)
Flower & Garnet (2002)
The Flower Girl (1972)
The Flower of My Secret (1995)
Flower and Snake: Zero (2014)
The Flower Woman of Potsdam Square (1925)
Flowers in the Attic: (1987 & 2014)
Flowers from Nice (1936)
Flowers in the Shadows (2008)
Flowers of Shanghai (1998)
The Flowers of St. Francis (1950)
Flowers and Trees (1932)
The Flowers of War (2011)
Flubber (1997)
The Fluffer (2002)
Fluke (1995)
Flushed Away (2006)
Flux Gourmet (2022)
The Fly: (1958 & 1986)
The Fly II (1989)
Fly Away Home: (1996 & 2016)
Fly Me to the Moon (2008)
Fly-by-Night (1942)
Flyboys (2006)
Flying Boys (2004)
The Flying Deuces (1939)
Flying Disc Man from Mars (1950)
Flying Down to Rio (1933)
The Flying Dutchman: (1957, 1995 & 2000)
The Flying Fool: (1925, 1929 & 1931)
Flying Leathernecks (1951)
The Flying Monster (1985)
Flying Padre (1951)
The Flying Squad: (1929, 1932 & 1940)
Flying Swords of Dragon Gate (2011)
Flying Tigers (1942)
Flying Wild (1941)
Flywheel (2003)
Flåklypa Grand Prix (1975)
FM (1978)

Fo

Foa-Fom

Foam (2020)
Focus: (2001 & 2015)
Focus, Please! (1956)
Fodder and Son (1957)
Foetus (1994)
Fog: (1932 & 1933)
The Fog: (1980 & 2005)
Fog in August (2016)
Fog Bound (1923)
Fog City Mavericks (2007)
Fog and Night (2007)
Fog Over Frisco (1934)
Fog and Sun (1951)
The Fog of War: Eleven Lessons from the Life of Robert S. McNamara (2004)
Fog Warning (2008)
Foghorn (1952)
Fogo (2012)
Fogo de Palha (1926)
Folklore: The Long Pond Studio Sessions (2020)
Folks! (1992)
Follies Girl (1943)
Follow the Band (1943)
Follow the Boys: (1944 & 1963)
Follow the Crowd (1918)
Follow the Fleet (1936)
Follow the Fox (2014)
Follow the Girl (1917)
Follow Kadri, Not Your Heart (2009)
Follow the Lady (1933)
Follow the Leader: (1930 & 1944)
Follow the Legion (1942)
Follow Me (1989)
Follow Me! (1972)
Follow Me Home (1996)
Follow Me My Queen (2015)
Follow Me Quietly (1949)
Follow Me, Boys! (1966)
Follow Me, Scoundrels (1964)
Follow the Prophet (2009)
Follow the River (1995 TV)
Follow a Star (1959)
Follow the Star (1978)
Follow the Stars Home (2001 TV)
Follow the Sun (1951)
Follow That Camel (1967)
Follow That Dream (1962)
Follow That Horse! (1960)
Follow That Man: (1953 & 1961)
Follow That Woman (1945)
Follow Thru (1930)
Follow Your Heart: (1936 & 1996)
Follow Your Star (1938)
"#FollowFriday" (2016)
Followed (2018)
Followers (2000)
Following (1998)
Following Her Heart (1994 TV)
Following Sean (2005)
"#Followme" (2019)
"#Followme II" (2022)
Folly to Be Wise (1953)
Folly of Love (1928)
Foma Gordeyev (1959)

Foo

Food (1992)
Food for Fighters (1943)
Food for the Gods (2007)
The Food of the Gods (1976)
Food of the Gods II (1989)
Food, Inc. (2009)
Food of Love: (1997 & 2002)
Food and Magic (1943)
Food for Scandal (1920)
Food Stamped (2010)
Food Will Win the War (1942)
Foodfight! (2012)
Foodland (2010)
A Fool (2014)
The Fool: (1913, 1925, 1990 & 2014)
Fool Circle (2014)
Fool Coverage (1952)
A Fool and His Money: (1912, 1920, 1925 & 1989)
Fool for Love: (1985 & 2010)
Fool Moon (2016)
A Fool There Was: (1914, 1915 & 1922)
Fool's Gold: (1919, 1947 & 2008)
Fool's Luck (1926)
Fool's Mate: (1956 & 1989)
Fool's Paradise (1921)
Foolish (1999)
Foolish Age (2013)
Foolish Happiness (1929)
Foolish Heart (1998)
Foolish Plans (2016)
Foolish Wives (1922)
Foolishness of His Love (1929)
Foolproof (2003)
Fools (1970)
Fools of Fashion (1926)
Fools of Fate (1909)
Fools First (1922)
Fools of Fortune (1990)
Fools Highway (1924)
Fools for Luck (1928)
Fools and Riches (1923)
Fools Rush In: (1949, 1973 & 1997)
Fools for Scandal (1938)
Fools and Their Money (1919)
Fools' Parade (1971)
Football (1982)
Football Days (2003)
The Football Factory (2004)
Football of the Good Old Days (1973)
Football, Love, and Bullfighting (1929)
Football Under Cover (2008)
Footfalls (1921)
Footlight Fever (1941)
Footlight Glamour (1943)
Footlight Parade (1933)
Footlight Serenade (1942)
Footlights (1921)
Footlights and Fools (1929)
Footloose: (1984 & 2011)
Footloose Widows (1926)
Footnote (2011)
Footpads (1895)
Footpath: (1953 & 2003)
Footprint in the Ocean (1964)
Footprints (2011)
Footprints on the Moon: (1969 & 1975)
Footrot Flats: The Dog's Tale (1986)
Footskating 101 (2007)
Footsteps (2003 TV)
Footsteps in the Dark (1941)
Footsteps in the Fog (1955)
Footsteps in the Night (1957)
Footsteps in the Sand (2010)
Footsteps in the Snow (1966)
Footy Legends (2006)

For

For All Mankind (1989)
For the Birds (2000)
For Colored Girls (2010)
For Eternal Hearts (2007)
For a Few Bullets (2016)
For a Few Dollars More (1965)
For the First Time: (1959 & 2008)
For a Good Time, Call... (2012)
For Heaven's Sake: (1926, 1950 & 2008)
For a Lost Soldier (1992)
For the Love of Ada (1972)
For Love or Country: The Arturo Sandoval Story (2000) (TV)
For Love of the Game (1999)
For Love or Money (1993)
For Me and My Gal (1942)
For No Good Reason (2012)
For One Night (2006) (TV)
For Queen and Country (1989)
For Richer or Poorer (1997)
For Scent-imental Reasons (1949)
For Those in Peril: (1944 & 2013)
For Those Who Think Young (1964)
For Whom the Bell Tolls (1943)
For Your Consideration (2006)
For Your Eyes Only (1981)
Forbidden: (1919, 1932, 1949, 1953 & 1984)
The Forbidden Door (2009)
Forbidden Dream (2019)
Forbidden Dreams (1987)
Forbidden Forest (2004)
Forbidden Fruit: (1921, 1952, 1953, 2000 & 2009)
Forbidden Games (1952)
The Forbidden Kingdom (2008)
Forbidden Love: The Unashamed Stories of Lesbian Lives (1992)
Forbidden Planet (1956)
The Forbidden Room: (1914, 1977 & 2015)
Forbidden Zone (1982)
The Force (2019)
Force 10 from Navarone (1978)
Force of Evil (1948)
Force Majeure (2014)
Force of Nature (2020)
A Force of One (1979)
Forces of Nature: (1999 & 2004)
Ford v Ferrari (2019)
A Foreign Affair (1948)
Foreign Correspondent (1940)
A Foreign Field (1993) (TV)
Foreign Intrigue (1956)
The Foreigner: (2003 & 2017)
Foreigners (1972)
The Forest: (1953, 1982, 2002, 2005, 2009 & 2016)
The Forest of Love (2019)
Forever After (1926)
Forever Amber (1947)
Forever and a Day: (1943 & 2011)
Forever Enthralled (2008)
Forever Love: (2014 & 2015)
Forever Mine (1999)
Forever the Moment (2008)
The Forever Purge (2021)
Forever Young: (1992 & 2014)
The Forger: (1928, 2011 & 2014)
Les Forgerons (1895)
Forget All Remember (2014)
Forget Paris (1995)
Forgetting Sarah Marshall (2008)
Forgive and Forget: (1923 & 2000 TV)
The Forgiveness of Blood (2011)
Forgotten: (1933, 2012 TV, 2013 & 2017)
The Forgotten: (1973, 2003, 2004, 2014 & 2019)
The Forgotten Battle (2020)
The Forgotten Frontier (1931)
Forgotten Silver (1995)
Forgotten We'll Be (2020)
Forklift Driver Klaus – The First Day on the Job (2000)
Formosa (2005)
The Formula: (1980 & 2002)
Formula 17 (2004)
Formula 51 (2001)
Forrest Gump (1994)
The Forsaken (2001)
Fort Apache (1948)
Fort Saganne (1984)
Fortress: (1985, 1992 & 2012)
The Fortress: (1979, 1994, 2017 & 2022)
Fortress 2: Re-Entry (1999)
The Fortune (1975)
The Fortune Cookie (1966)
Fortune Favors the Brave (1908)
Fortune Favors Lady Nikuko (2021)
Fortune Is a Woman (1957)
Forty Guns (1957)
Forty Little Mothers: (1936 & 1940)
Forty Shades of Blue (2005)
Forty Thieves (1944)
Forty Thousand Horsemen (1940)

Fos-Fox

Foster (2011)
Foster Child: (1987 & 2007)
Foster Daddy, Tora! (1980)
Foster and Laurie (1975 TV)
Fotógrafo de señoras (1978)
Fotonovela (2008)
Fouetté (1986)
The Foul King (2000)
Foul Play: (1920, 1977 & 1978)
Found (2012)
Found Alive (1933)
Found Footage 3D (2016)
Found Memories (2011)
The Founder (2016)
Foundry Town (1962)
The Fountain (2006)
Fountain of Trevi (1960)
The Fountainhead (1949)
Four: (2011 & 2012)
Four Adventures of Reinette and Mirabelle (1987)
Four of the Apocalypse (1975)
Four Around a Woman (1921)
Four Assassins (2011)
Four Billion in Four Minutes (1976)
Four Boxes (2009)
Four Boys and a Gun (1957)
Four Brothers (2005)
Four Christmases (2008)
Four Corners (2013)
Four Daughters (1938)
Four Days (1951)
Four Days in July (1984 TV)
Four Days in November (1964)
Four Days in September (1997)
Four Dogs Playing Poker (2000)
Four Eyes and Six Guns (1992 TV)
Four Faces of God (2002)
Four Faces West (1948)
Four Falls of Buffalo (2015)
Four Fast Guns (1960)
Four Feathers (1915)
The Four Feathers: (1921, 1929, 1939 & 2002)
Four First Nights (1990)
Four Flies on Grey Velvet (1971)
Four Friends: (1981 & 2010)
Four Frightened People (1934)
Four Girls from Hong Kong (1972)
Four Girls in Town (1957)
Four Girls in White (1939)
Four Good Days (2020)
Four Gunmen of the Holy Trinity (1971)
Four Guns to the Border (1954) 
Four Hands (2011)
Four Hands Dinner (1999)
Four Hearts: (1939 & 1941)
Four Hits and a Mister (1962)
Four Horsemen (2012)
Four Horsemen of the Apocalypse (1962)
The Four Horsemen of the Apocalypse (1921)
Four Hours Before His Death (1953)
Four Hours to Kill! (1935)
Four Jacks (2001)
Four Jacks and a Jill (1942)
Four Jills in a Jeep (1944)
Four Kids and It (2020)
Four Last Songs (2007)
Four Letter Words (2000)
Four Lions (2010)
Four Loves (1965)
Four Mothers (1941)
The Four Musketeers: (1934, 1936, 1963 & 1974)
Four Nights of a Dreamer (1971)
Four Rooms (1995)
The Four Seasons: (1979 & 1981)
Four Shades of Brown (2004)
Four Sisters Before the Wedding (2020)
Four Sisters and a Wedding (2013)
Four for Venice (1998)
Four Weddings and a Funeral (1994)
Four Wives (1939)
Four's a Crowd (1938)
Fourteen (2019)
Fourteen Hours (1951)
The Fourteenth Man (1920)
The Fourth Estate (1940)
The Fourth Kind (2009)
The Fourth Man: (1983 & 2007)
The Fox Family (2006)
The Fox of Glenarvon (1940)
Fox and His Friends (1976)
The Fox and the Hound (1981)
The Fox and the Hound 2 (2006)
The Fox with Nine Tails (1994)
Foxcatcher (2014)
Foxes (1980)
Foxfire: (1955, 1987 & 1996)
Foxtrot: (1976 & 2017)
The Foxtrot (1971 TV)
Foxy Brown (1974)

Fr

Fracchia contro Dracula (1985)
Fracchia la belva umana (1981)
Frackman (2015)
Fracture: (2004 & 2007)
Fractured: (2013 & 2019)
Fractured Follies (1988)
Fractured Land (2015)
Fragile (2005)
Fragile Storm (2015)
Fragment of an Empire (1929)
Fragment of Fear (1970)
Frailty: (1921 & 2001)
The Frame (2014)
Framed: (1930, 1947, 1975 & 1990 TV)
France (2021)
Frances (1982)
Frances Ha (2013)
Francesca (2009)
Francis the Talking Mule series:
Francis (1950)
Francis Goes to the Races (1951)
Francis Goes to West Point (1952)
Francis Covers the Big Town (1953)
Francis Joins the WACS (1954)
Francis in the Navy (1955)
Francis in the Haunted House (1956)
Francisca (1981)
Frank (2014)
Frank en Eva (1973)
Frank Film (1973)
Frank & Lola (2016)
Frankenfish (2004)
Frankenhooker (1990)
Frankenstein: (1910, 1973 TV, 1992 TV, 2004, 2007 TV & 2015)
Frankenstein series:
Frankenstein (1931)
Bride of Frankenstein (1935)
Son of Frankenstein (1939)
Ghost of Frankenstein (1942)
Frankenstein Meets the Wolf Man (1943)
House of Frankenstein (1944)
House of Dracula (1945)
Abbott and Costello Meet Frankenstein (1948)
Frankenstein 1970 (1958)
Frankenstein Conquers the World (1965)
Frankenstein Created Woman (1967)
Frankenstein and the Monster from Hell (1974)
Frankenstein Must Be Destroyed (1969)
Frankenstein Unbound (1990)
Frankenstein: The True Story (1973) (TV)
Frankenstein's Daughter (1958)
Frankenweenie: (1984 & 2012)
Frankie and Johnny: (1966 & 1991)
Franklin and the Green Knight (2000)
Franklin and the Turtle Lake Treasure (2006)
Franklin's Magic Christmas (2001)
Franklyn (2009)
Frantic (1988)
Frantz (2016)
Franz (1971)
Franz Schubert (1953)
Frat House (1998)
Fraternity Row (1977)
Fraternity Vacation (1985)
Frau im Mond (1929)
Fraud (2016)
Fraud Saiyaan (2019)
Frauds (1993)
Freak (1998)
Freak Talks About Sex (1999)
Freaked (1993)
Freaks: (1932 & 2018)
Freaks of Nature (2015)
Freaks: You're One of Us (2020)
Freaky (2020)
Freaky Friday: (1976, 1995 TV, 2003 & 2018 TV)
Fred (2014)
Fred Claus (2007)
Fred Ott's Sneeze (1894)
Fred: The Movie series:
Fred: The Movie (2010)
Fred 2: Night of the Living Fred (2011)
Fred 3: Camp Fred (2012)
Freddy Got Fingered (2001)
Freddy's Dead: The Final Nightmare (1991)
Free (2001)
Free Birds (2013)
Free Fire (2016)
Free Guy (2021)
Free Hand for a Tough Cop (1976)
Free Solo (2018)
Free Soul (1931)
Free Willy series:
Free Willy (1993)
Free Willy 2: The Adventure Home (1995)
Free Willy 3: The Rescue (1997)
Free Willy: Escape from Pirate's Cove (2010)
Freebie and the Bean (1974)
Freedom Downtime (2001)
 Freedom Fields (2018)
Freedom Writers (2007)
Freedomland (2006)
Freejack (1992)
Freeway (1988 & 1996)
Freeway II: Confessions of a Trickbaby (1999)
Freeze Frame (2004)
Freeze Me (2000)
French Cancan (1955)
The French Connection (1971)
French Connection II (1975)
The French Dispatch (2021)
French Exit: (1995 & 2020)
French Kiss: (1995, 2011 & 2015)
The French Kissers (2009)
The French Lieutenant's Woman (1981)
The French Minister (2013)
French Rarebit (1951)
French Twist (1996)
Frenemies (2012)
Frenzy (1972)
Frequency (2000)
Frequently Asked Questions About Time Travel (2009)
Fresh: (1994 & 2009)
Fresh Hare (1942)
Fresh Horses (1988)
The Freshman: (1925 & 1990)
Freud: The Secret Passion (1962)
Frida (2002)
Friday: (2012 & 2016)
Friday series:
Friday (1995)
Next Friday (2000)
Friday After Next (2002)
Friday the 13th series:
Friday the 13th: (1980 & 2009)
Friday the 13th Part 2 (1981)
Friday the 13th Part III (1982)
Friday the 13th: The Final Chapter (1984)
Friday the 13th: A New Beginning (1985)
Friday the 13th Part VI: Jason Lives (1986)
Friday the 13th Part VII: The New Blood (1988)
Friday the 13th Part VIII: Jason Takes Manhattan (1989)
Freddy vs. Jason (2003)
Friday Night: (2000 & 2002)
Friday Night Lights (2004)
Fried Barry (2020)
Fried Green Tomatoes (1991)
Friedemann Bach (1941)
Friend (2001)
A Friend of Mine (2011)
Friend of the World (2020)
Friendly Persuasion (1956)
Friends: (1971, 1999 & 2001)
Friends with Benefits (2011)
The Friends of Eddie Coyle (1973)
Friends from France (2013)
Friends with Kids (2012)
Friends with Money (2006)
Fright Night: (1985 & 2011)
Fright Night Part 2 (1988)
The Frighteners (1996)
Frigid Hare (1949)
Frisco Kid (1935)
The Frisco Kid (1979)
Fritz the Cat (1972)
Frivolous Wife (2008)
The Frog Prince: (1971, 1985 & 1986)
Frogs (1972)
The Frogville (2014)
From Beyond (1986)
From Beyond the Grave (1974)
From the Drain (1967)
From Dusk Till Dawn series:
From Dusk Till Dawn (1996)
From Dusk Till Dawn 2: Texas Blood Money (1999)
From Dusk Till Dawn 3: The Hangman's Daughter (2000)
From the Earth to the Moon (1958)
From Hell (2001)
From Here to Eternity (1953)
From Justin to Kelly (2003)
From the Life of a Chief of the Criminal Police (1983)
From the Life of Fyodor Kuzkin (1989)
From the Life of the Marionettes (1980) (TV)
From the Manger to the Cross (1912)
From the Mixed-Up Files of Mrs. Basil E. Frankweiler: (1973 & 1995 TV)
From Noon till Three (1976)
From Now On (2007)
From Paris with Love (2010)
From Russia with Love (1963)
From Soup to Nuts (1928)
From Stump to Ship (1930)
From the Terrace (1960)
From Up on Poppy Hill (2011)
From Vegas to Macau (2014)
From Vegas to Macau II (2015)
From Where They Stood (2021)
From a Whisper to a Scream (1987)
The Front (1976)
The Front Page: (1931 & 1974)
The Front Runner (2018)
Frontier Horizon (1939)
Frontier(s) (2008)
Frost/Nixon (2009)
Frostbite: (2005 & 2006)
Frostbiter: Wrath of the Wendigo (1995)
Frosty Roads (1985)
Frosty the Snowman (1969) (TV)
Frownland (2007)
Frozen: (1997, 2005, 2007, 2010 American, 2010 Hong Kong & 2013)
Frozen II (2019)
Frozen with Fear (2000)
Frozen River (2008)
The Fruit Hunters (2012)
Fruit of Paradise (1970)
Fruits of Passion: (1919 & 1981)
Fruitvale Station (2013)
Frække Frida (1994)

Fu

Fu Bo (2003)
FUBAR (2002)
FUBAR 2 (2010)
Fuck (2006)
Fuck for Forest (2012)
Fucking Idiots (2020)
Fuck My Life (2010)
Fuck Up (2012) 
Fucking with Nobody (2020)
Fuckland (2000)
Fudge 44 (2005)
Fudoh: The New Generation (1996)
Fuego: (1969 & 2007)
Fuego en el alma (2005)
Fuel (2008)
Fueled: The Man They Called Pirate (2016)
Fuelin' Around (1949)
Fuelling Poverty (2012)
Fuera de la ley (1964)
Fuera del cielo (2007)
The Fugitive: (1910, 1920, 1925, 1933, 1947 American, 1947 French, 1972, 1993 & 2003)
The Fugitive Kind (1959)
A Fugitive from Matrimony (1919)
A Fugitive from the Past (1965)
Fuji (1975)
Fujian Blue (2007)
Full Alert (1997)
Full Body Massage (1995)
Full Contact (1992)
A Full Day's Work (1973)
Full Disclosure: (2001 & 2005)
Full Frontal (2002)
Full Metal Jacket (1987)
The Full Monteverdi (2007)
The Full Monty (1997)
Full Moon High (1981)
Full Moon in New York (1989)
Full Moon in Paris (1984)
Full-Court Miracle (2003) (TV)
Fullmetal Alchemist series:
Fullmetal Alchemist the Movie: Conqueror of Shamballa (2005)
Fullmetal Alchemist: The Sacred Star of Milos (2011)
Fullmetal Alchemist (2017)
"#FullMethod" (2019)
Fulltime Killer (2001)
Fumō Chitai (1976)
Fun in Acapulco (1963)
Fun with Dick and Jane: (1977 & 2005)
Fun Down There (1988)
Fun and Fancy Free (1947)
The Fun House (1973)
Fun Size (2012)
The Funeral: (1984 & 1996)
Funeral in Berlin (1966)
Funeral Home (1980)
Funeral Parade of Roses (1969)
The Funhouse (1981)
The Funhouse Massacre (2015)
Funky Forest (2005)
Funky Monkey (2004)
Funny About Love (1990)
Funny Bones (1995)
Funny Face: (1957 & 2020)
Funny Farm (1988)
Funny Games (1997 & 2007)
Funny Girl (1964)
Funny Ha Ha (2007)
Funny Lady (1975)
Funny Pages (2022)
Funny People (2009)
A Funny Thing Happened on the Way to the Forum (1966)
Fur: An Imaginary Portrait of Diane Arbus (2006)
The Furies: (1930 & 1950)
Furry Vengeance (2010)
Fursonas (2016)
The Further Adventures of the Wilderness Family (1978)
Fury: (1923, 1936, 1947, 2012 & 2014)
The Fury (1978)
The Fury of Achilles (1962)
The Fury of a Patient Man (2016)
The Fury of the Wolfman (1972)
A Futile and Stupid Gesture (2018)
Futurama  series:
Futurama: Bender's Big Score (2007)
Futurama: The Beast with a Billion Backs (2008)
Futurama: Bender's Game (2008)
Futurama: Into the Wild Green Yonder (2009)
The Future (2011)
Future Lasts Forever (2011)
Future Past (1987)
Future Shock (1972)
Future Shock! The Story of 2000AD (2014)
Future War (1997)
Futuresport (1998) (TV)
Futureworld (1976)

Fy

Fyre (2019)
Fyre Fraud (2019)

Previous:  List of films: E    Next:  List of films: G

See also 
Lists of films
Lists of actors
List of film and television directors
List of documentary films
List of film production companies

-